Suansu is an unclassified Tangkhulic language of Manipur, India, first reported in 2019.

Resources 
 Lexibank data (GitHub)
 Lexibank data (Zenodo)

References

Tangkhulic languages